Stara Kuźnica is a village in the administrative district of Gmina Doruchów, within Ostrzeszów County, Greater Poland Voivodeship, in west-central Poland.

References 

Villages in Ostrzeszów County